Satyricon is the eighth studio album by Norwegian black metal band Satyricon. It is their first topping VG-lista, the official Norwegian albums chart. It was released throughout Europe on 9 September 2013, and released on 17 September 2013 in US and Canada.

Track listing

Personnel

Satyricon
Satyr – vocals, electric guitar, acoustic guitar, bass guitar, keyboards, percussion
Frost – drums

Additional personnel
Gildas Le Pape – guitars, additional bass guitar
Sivert Høyem – vocals on "Phoenix"
Erik Ljunggren – keyboards
Kjetil Bjerkestrand – pump organ on "Natt"
Karl Oluf Wennerberg – percussion on "Phoenix"

Production
Satyr – arrangements, production, mixing
Erik Ljunggren – lead recording
Jacob Dobewall – recording assistance
Mike Hartung – recording assistance
Adam Kasper – mixing 
Nate Yaccino – mixing, recording assistance
Sam Hoffstedt – additional mixing, recording assistance
Paul Logus – mastering

Charts

References

2013 albums
Satyricon (band) albums
Nuclear Blast albums
Roadrunner Records albums
Indie Recordings albums